Ratan Tallukder (born 28 January 1957) is a Bangladeshi film actor, fighting director and karate instructor. He usually played supporting negative roles. He debuted as a film actor in the 1986 film Laraku directed by Shahidul Islam Khokon.

Early life 
Ratan Talukder was born in Myanmar in 1957. His father, Adhir Ranjan Talukder was a medical doctor working for the British Army in Myanmar. They relocated to Chittagong, Bangladesh in 1965. Ratan Talukder started martial arts in the 70s and was a fan of martial arts films.

Career
The first film he acted in was Bir Purush (1988). He made his name in Bojro Mushti (1989) and acted in about 15 films. He also worked as a Fight Director in some films. He often worked with Masum Parvez Rubel, Humayun Faridi and Ilias Kobra. Most of his films directed by Shahidul Islam Khokon.

Filmography

Karate instructor
Takulder is one of the leading karate instructors in the continent. He obtained 7 dan from WUKF and 4 dan from Japan Karate Association. He is the founder and chief coach of Honke Shotokan Karate-Do Association Bangladesh. Talukder has also obtained a licence of International Karate Referee from Asian Karate Federation Gi Asian Judge. He is vice-chairman of the Bangladesh Karate Referee Association.

Personal life
Talukder resides in Chittagong. He is married to Shilpi and has 3 children together.

References

External links

1957 births
Living people
20th-century Bangladeshi male actors
21st-century Bangladeshi actors
Bangladeshi male film actors
Shotokan practitioners
Karate coaches
Martial arts school founders
People from Chittagong
People from Chittagong District
Bangladeshi Buddhists
Bangladeshi people
Bengali people